Start the Car is the third solo album from the singer/songwriter Jude Cole. Released in 1992, five years after his self-titled debut solo album.

After A View from Third Street, Jude Cole shifted to a more heartland rock sound. Nowhere is that more evident than the disc's title song first track, a combination of Springsteen/Mellencamp that rocks more than his previous two albums. It features the polished heartbreak of "Tell the Truth", the sad sack story of "First Your Money" and the been-there, done-that weary world of "A Place in the Line".

Start the Car peaked at number 46 in Australia.

Track listing
All songs written and composed by Jude Cole except where noted.

 "Start the Car" — 5:07
 "Worlds Apart" (Cole, Ron Aniello) — 3:54
 "Open Road" — 5:19
 "Just Another Night" (Cole, James Newton Howard) — 3:47
 "Tell the Truth" — 5:27
 "Intro" — 0:43
 "Right There Now" — 5:05
 "First Your Money (Then Your Clothes)" (Cole, George Green) — 4:12
 "It Comes Around" — 4:38
 "Blame It on Fate" — 4:50
 "A Place in the Line" — 4:31

Personnel
John Robinson, Jim Keltner, Jeff Porcaro, Pat Mastelotto - drums
Robbie Buchanan - drum programming
Lenny Castro - percussion
James Newton Howard, Steve Porcaro, Marc Greene, Robbie Buchanan - keyboards
David Paich, James Newton Howard, Bill Payne - piano
Mike Finnegan, Marc Greene - organ
Jude Cole, Tim Pierce, Michael Landau, Michael Thompson, Ron Aniello - guitar
Lee Sklar, Neil Stubenhaus, Jude Cole - bass
Richard Green - violin
Jude Cole, Ron Aniello - mandolin
Jude Cole - hammered dulcimer
Jerry Hey, Larry Williams, Gary Grant, Daniel Higgins - horns
Jude Cole, Sass Jordan, Tommy Shaw, Jack Blades, Sam Llanas, John Elefante, Chuck Sabatino, Robert Parlee, Philip Ingram - backing vocals
Technical
Marc Greene, Chris Lord-Alge, Bob Schaper, Erich Gobel - recording engineer
Chris Lord-Alge - mixing
Michael Ostin - executive producer
John Halpern, Rick Cole, John Heiden, Jeri Heiden, Michael Wilson - photography
Jeri Heiden - art direction

Charts

References 

1992 albums
Jude Cole albums
Reprise Records albums